Port Henderson  is a fishing village on the south west shore of the Gair Loch near the village of Gairloch, Ross-shire, Scottish Highlands and is in the Scottish council area of Highland.

The villages of South Erradale and Opinan are located directly south from the village along the B8056 coast road.

References

Populated places in Ross and Cromarty